T. K. Ramakrishnan (1922 – 21 April 2006) was a politician from Tripunithura, Kerala, India. Ramakrishnan won the assembly elections seven times and was the opposition leader in the fifth Kerala Legislative Assembly in 1979. He was in charge of the Home, Excise, Cultural Affairs and Fisheries Departments during the Left Democratic Front administration at different times. He was a Central Committee member of Communist Party of India (Marxist).  T. K. Ramakrishnan died 21 April 2006. T.K started his public life in the student movement and later became a trade union activist. He functioned as the State President and Secretary of the Kerala Karshaka Sanghom. Com. T. K was a multi- faceted personality. He had left his mark in the cultural front also. He had also excelled in his role as M.L.A and as a Cabinet Minister in charge of various portfolios like fisheries, co-operation, culture etc.

He was a lover of books and arts. He wrote a series of plays, which highlighted the social realities of the time and which propagated the Communist ideology. He also wrote a novel Kallile Theepporikal (Sparks from the rock).

He is credited with the creation of various cultural institutions that enriched Kerala society such as Council of Historic Research and the Institute of Heritage.

References

External links

Writers from Kochi
Communist Party of India (Marxist) politicians from Kerala
1922 births
2006 deaths
Malayali politicians
Leaders of the Opposition in Kerala
Politicians from Kochi
Malayalam-language writers
Kerala MLAs 1957–1959
Kerala MLAs 1960–1964
Kerala MLAs 1967–1970
Kerala MLAs 1977–1979
Kerala MLAs 1991–1996
Trade unionists from Kerala
Indian Marxist writers
20th-century Indian dramatists and playwrights
Dramatists and playwrights from Kerala